Ancestry Magazine was a general interest genealogy magazine owned by Ancestry.com Operations Inc. The magazine received a 2009 Gold Eddie Award in the enthusiast category for its article, The Man (or Woman) Who Would Be King. Eddie awards are granted annually by Folio magazine for excellence in editorial content. The headquarters was in Provo, Utah.

The magazine began as Ancestry Newsletter, a small, genealogy-industry newsletter in 1983, and became a four-color, 68-page, glossy print, bimonthly publication in 1994. After more than 25 years in print, the magazine was discontinued with the March/April 2010 issue.

In mid-2009, Ancestry magazine began making its past issues available online at Google Books and at its website.

References

Bimonthly magazines published in the United States
Defunct magazines published in the United States
Genealogy publications
Hobby magazines published in the United States
Magazines established in 1994
Magazines disestablished in 2010
Magazines published in Utah
Mass media in Salt Lake City
Newsletters